Interior life is a life which seeks God in everything, a life of prayer and the practice of living in the presence of God. It connotes intimate, friendly conversation with Him, and a determined focus on internal prayer versus external actions, while these latter are transformed into means of prayer.

According to John Paul II, Jesus' statement "without me you can do nothing" (cf. Jn 15:5) is a truth that "constantly reminds us of the primacy of Christ and, in union with him, the primacy of the interior life and of holiness."

In his first encyclical Deus caritas est, Benedict XVI emphasized that man "cannot always give, he must also receive," and pointed to the urgency and importance of experiencing in prayer that God is Love. He taught the Christian's dialogue with God "allows God to work" for God is "the only One who can make the world both good and happy."

According to John Tauler(1290-1361)interior life is the condition of our soul, the offenses against God that we have committed. Man may learn the difference between various kinds of sin, to think of them more intelligently, and thereby have greater sorrow for them and guard more carefully against committing them. Attack thy faults, condemn they faults with resolute courage. Interior faults are a real hindrance to spiritual life. We need to be on guard for God will not let these faults go unpunished.

Biblical basis

This doctrine in Catholic theology is usually based on the Jesus's commendation of Mary of Bethany's contemplation over the anxious external worries of her sister Martha. Jesus told Martha that "one thing is necessary. Mary hath chosen the best part" (Luke 10:42).

Mary, the mother of Jesus Christ, and considered as the greatest of all saints in the Catholic Church, is mentioned in the Bible that she "pondered these things in her heart," an expression of intense prayer and contemplation of the events that happened to her.

The idea of "life" is present in the biblical distinction between two Greek terms for life: bios (biological life) and zoe (divine, supernatural life). Zoe is used in the bible in passages such as "That you may have life, and have it more abundantly". In Catholic theology, this life has been understood as a participation in divine, intratrinitarian life introduced in the life of a Christian at baptism (Cf. "partakers of the divine nature" in 2 Pt 1:4), and which grows through further reception of the sacraments, channels of grace which in its essence is "divine life." This divine life also grows through constant communication with God.

Thomas a Kempis: Imitation of Christ

This doctrine is based on the writings of many Catholic spiritual writers through the centuries, of which the best known is the Imitation of Christ by Thomas a Kempis, one of the most widely read Christian spiritual books in existence. The book taught:

"The kingdom of God is within you," says the Lord. Turn, then, to God with all your heart. Forsake this wretched world and your soul shall find rest. Learn to despise external things, to devote yourself to those that are within, and you will see the kingdom of God come unto you, that kingdom which is peace and joy in the Holy Spirit, gifts not given to the impious. Christ will come to you offering His consolation, if you prepare a fit dwelling for Him in your heart, whose beauty and glory, wherein He takes delight, are all from within. His visits with the inward man are frequent, His communion sweet and full of consolation, His peace great, and His intimacy wonderful indeed. Therefore, faithful soul, prepare your heart for this Bridegroom that He may come and dwell within you; He Himself says: "If any one love Me, he will keep My word, and My Father will love him, and We will come to him, and will make Our abode with him."

Garrigou-Lagrange: Three Ages of the Interior Life

The most basic book about this topic is The Three Ages of the Interior Life by French theologian Reginald Garrigou-Lagrange. He compares the interior life to the usual interior conversation which each man has with himself. Fr. Garrigou says:

"As soon as a man seriously seeks truth and goodness, this intimate conversation with himself tends to become conversation with God. Little by little, instead of seeking himself in everything, instead of tending more or less consciously to make himself a center, man tends to seek God in everything, and to substitute for egoism love of God and of souls in Him. This constitutes the interior life... The one thing necessary which Jesus spoke of to Martha and Mary consists in hearing the word of God and living by it." (Introduction).

Dom Chautard: Soul of the Apostolate

Another classic on this topic is the book by Jean-Baptiste Chautard, Soul of the Apostolate where he says that the evangelization of people is but a result of one's inner life of union with God.

He says:

The Incarnation and the Redemption establish Jesus as the Source, and the only Source, of this divine life which all men are called upon to share... Failure on the part of the apostle, to realize this principle, and the illusion that he could produce the slightest trace of supernatural life without borrowing every bit of it from Jesus Christ, would lead us to believe that his ignorance of theology was equaled only by his stupid self-conceit. (Italics in the original)

Josef Pieper

Commenting on Thomas Aquinas's words on contemplation, "It is requisite for the good of the human community that there should be persons who devote themselves to the life of contemplation," Josef Pieper said "For it is contemplation which preserves in the midst of human society the truth which is at one and the same time useless and the yardstick of every possible use; so it is also contemplation which keeps the true end in sight, gives meaning to every practical act of life."

Josemaría Escrivá: The Way
 

The founder of Opus Dei, St. Josemaría Escrivá took inspiration from previous spiritual writers such as Ignatius of Loyola, Teresa of Ávila, Thomas à Kempis and Dom Chautard.

Pedro Rodriguez who wrote the critical edition of Escriva's The Way said that Escrivá was inspired by the book of Dom Chautard when he wrote that the "apostolate is an overflow of the interior life."

Thus, John Paul II said during Escrivá's canonization:

Today this invitation is extended to all of us: "Put out into the deep", the divine Teacher says to us, "and let down your nets for a catch" (Lk 5,4). To fulfill such a rigorous mission, one needs constant interior growth nourished by prayer. St. Josemaría was a master in the practice of prayer, which he considered to be an extraordinary "weapon" to redeem the world. He always recommended: "In the first place prayer; then expiation; in the third place, but very much in third place, action" (The Way, n. 82). It is not a paradox but a perennial truth: the fruitfulness of the apostolate lies above all in prayer and in intense and constant sacramental life. This, in essence, is the secret of the holiness and the true success of the saints.

For Escrivá, lay Christians are called to sanctity in the midst of their ordinary work and daily activities. The sanctification of work and society is achieved by converting this work into prayer by offering work done with:

(a) professional competence and a spirit of excellence, both technical and ethical, practising virtues such as honesty, integrity, magnanimity, justice, 
(b) presence of God and rectitude of intention, living a life of grace, initiated at baptism and renewed through the sacraments of confession and the eucharist. This presence of God is sustained through the recitation of short prayers or aspirations during the day and at work, such as "Jesus, I love you", "All glory to God", "Queen of Apostles, pray for us." Sanctification of one's work is also enabled by other regular daily practices of prayer: praying the Holy Rosary, time spent in meditation, reading the Holy Gospel, and some spiritual books.

John Paul II: Novo Millennio Ineunte

At the beginning of the new millennium, John Paul II placed sanctity as the most important pastoral priority of the Catholic Church in his Apostolic Exhortation Novo Millennio Ineunte. And for this he emphasized the need for a training in the "art of prayer". He said that Catholic communities should become schools of prayer.

A key paragraph is:

 There is a temptation which perennially besets every spiritual journey and pastoral work: that of thinking that the results depend on our ability to act and to plan. God of course asks us really to cooperate with his grace, and therefore invites us to invest all our resources of intelligence and energy in serving the cause of the Kingdom. But it is fatal to forget that "without Christ we can do nothing" (cf. Jn 15:5). It is prayer which roots us in this truth. It constantly reminds us of the primacy of Christ and, in union with him, the primacy of the interior life and of holiness.

Benedict XVI: Deus caritas est

Benedict XVI also took up the theme in his first encyclical; being the first of his papacy, it is considered emblematic.

In Deus caritas est, the Pope-theologian explained the exact theological meaning of what John Paul II preached. The essence of sanctity is love, and we become love by experiencing love, especially through contemplative prayer.

“God is love, and he who abides in love abides in God, and God abides in him” (1 Jn 4:16). These words from the First Letter of John express with remarkable clarity the heart of the Christian faith: the Christian image of God and the resulting image of mankind and its destiny.

He would later say "I am convinced" that humanity truly needs the "essential message" that God is love. Thus, he says with echoes of John Paul's pastoral planning for the entire church: "Everything must start from here and everything must lead to here, every pastoral action, every theological treatise. As St Paul said, "If I ... have not love I gain nothing" (cf. I Cor 13:3)."

Pope Benedict explained that God is love, and that man is made in God's image and is therefore made for love. This love grows to the extent that man receives God's love: "we have to receive for us to give". Thus he stressed the "importance of prayer in the face of the activism and the growing secularism of many Christians engaged in charitable work."

He used the word urgent only once and in reference to the need for prayer: "Prayer, as a means of drawing ever new strength from Christ, is concretely and urgently needed."

He even mentioned Blessed Mother Teresa three times to stress that the roots of effective Christian service and charity is in prayer:

In the example of Blessed Teresa of Calcutta we have a clear illustration of the fact that time devoted to God in prayer not only does not detract from effective and loving service to our neighbour but is in fact the inexhaustible source of that service

On explaining one of the main themes, realization of true love via the union of agape and eros, he stresses that man "cannot always give, he must also receive."

Anyone who wishes to give love must also receive love as a gift... Yet to become such a source, one must constantly drink anew from the original source, which is Jesus Christ, from whose pierced heart flows the love of God... Only in the way of contemplation will he be able to take upon himself the needs of others and make them his own.

To further stress this way of contemplation, his Lenten message for 2007 was titled "They shall look on him whom they have pierced" (Jn 19:37). There he invited everyone:

Dear brothers and sisters, let us look at Christ pierced on the Cross! He is the unsurpassing revelation of God's love.. On the Cross, it is God himself who begs the love of his creature: He is thirsty for the love of every one of us... One could rightly say that the revelation of God's eros toward man is, in reality, the supreme expression of his agape.

He thus emphasizes that God's way of giving himself to us (agape) is by showing us that he wants us for himself (eros).

Benedict's point on the importance of "receiving love as a gift" is in line with his teaching in Introduction to Christianity on the primacy of receptivity or acceptance. The Christian's role is to "allow God to work" in us and through us, since God is "only one who can make the world both good and happy." We allow God to work, he says, when we "speak to God as a friend speaks to a friend."

See also
God: Sole Satisfier
Contemplative prayer

References

Catholic theology and doctrine
Catholic spirituality